An epistemic community is a network of knowledge-based experts who help decision-makers to define the problems they face, identify various policy solutions and assess the policy outcomes. The definitive conceptual framework of an epistemic community is widely accepted as that of Peter M. Haas. He describes them as "...a network of professionals with recognised expertise and competence in a particular domain and an authoritative claim to policy relevant knowledge within that domain or issue-area."
Although the members of an epistemic community may originate from a variety of academic or professional backgrounds, they are linked by a set of unifying characteristics for the promotion of collective amelioration and not collective gain. This is termed their "normative component". In the big picture, epistemic communities are socio-psychological entities that create and justify knowledge. Such communities can constitute of only two persons and yet gain an important role in building knowledge on any specific subject. Miika Vähämaa has recently  suggested that epistemic communities consist of persons being able to understand, discuss and gain self-esteem concerning the matters being discussed.

Some theorists argue that an epistemic community may consist of those who accept one version of a story, or one version of validating a story. Michel Foucault referred more elaborately to mathesis as a rigorous episteme suitable for enabling cohesion of a discourse and thus uniting a community of its followers.  In philosophy of science and systems science the process of forming a self-maintaining epistemic community is sometimes called a mindset.  In politics, a tendency or faction is usually described in very similar terms.

Most researchers carefully distinguish between epistemic forms of community and "real" or "bodily" community which consists of people sharing risk, especially bodily risk.

It is also problematic to draw the line between modern ideas and more ancient ones, for example, Joseph Campbell's concept of myth from cultural anthropology, and Carl Jung's concept of archetype in psychology. Some consider forming an epistemic community a deep human need, and ultimately a mythical or even religious obligation. Among these very notably are E. O. Wilson, as well as Ellen Dissanayake, an American historian of aesthetics who famously argued that almost all of our broadly shared conceptual metaphors centre on one basic idea of safety: that of "home".

From this view, an epistemic community may be seen as a group of people who do not have any specific history together, but search for a common idea of home as if forming an intentional community.  For example, an epistemic community can be found in a network of professionals from a wide variety of disciplines and backgrounds.

As discussed in Peter M. Haas's definitive text, an epistemic community is made up of a diverse range of academic and professional experts, who are allied on the basis of four unifying characteristics:

 a shared set of normative and principled beliefs which provide a value-based rationale for the social action of community members; 
 shared causal beliefs which are derived from their analysis of practices leading or contributing to a central set of problems in their domain and which then serve as the basis for elucidating the multiple linkages between possible policy actions and desired outcomes;
 shared notions of validity, i.e. intersubjective, internally defined criteria for weighing and validating knowledge in the domain of their expertise; and
 a common policy enterprise, or a set of common practices associated with a set of problems to which their professional competence is directed, presumably out of the conviction that human welfare will be enhanced as a consequence.

Thus, when viewed as an epistemic community, the overall enterprise of the expert members emerges as the product of a combination of shared beliefs and more subtle conformity pressures, rather than a direct drive for concurrence (Michael J. Mazarr). Epistemic communities also have a "normative component" meaning the end goal is always for the betterment of society, rather than self gain of the community itself (Peter M. Haas).

In international relations and political science, an epistemic community can also be referred to as a global network of knowledge-based professionals in scientific and technological areas that often affect policy decisions.

Role in Environmental Governance
The global environmental agenda is increasing in complexity and interconnectedness. Often environmental policymakers do not understand the technical aspects of the issues they are regulating. This affects their ability to define state interests and develop suitable solutions within cross-boundary environmental regulation.

As a result, conditions of uncertainty are produced which stimulate a demand for new information. Environmental crises play a significant role in exacerbating conditions of uncertainty for decision-makers. Political elites seek expert knowledge and advice to reduce this technical uncertainty, on issues including:
 the scale of environmental problems,
 cause-and-effect interrelations of ecological processes, and
 how (science-based) policy options will play out.

Therefore, epistemic communities can frame environmental problems as they see fit, and environmental decision-makers begin to make policy-shaping decisions based on these specific depictions.

The initial identification and bounding of environmental issues by epistemic community members is very influential. They can limit what would be preferable in terms of national interests, frame what issues are available for collective debate, and delimit the policy alternatives deemed possible. The political effects are not easily reversible. The epistemic community vision is institutionalised as a collective set of understandings reflected in any subsequent policy choices.

This is a key point of power. Policy actors are persuaded to conform to the community’s consensual, knowledge-driven ideas without the epistemic community requiring a more material form of power. Members of successful communities can become strong actors at the national and international level as decision-makers attach responsibility to their advice.

As a result, epistemic communities have a direct input on how international cooperation may develop in the long term. Transboundary environmental problems require a unified response rather than patchwork policy efforts, but this is problematic due to enduring differences of state interest and concerns over reciprocity. The transnational nature of epistemic communities means numerous states may absorb new patterns of logic and behaviour, leading to the adoption of concordant state policies. Therefore, the likelihood of convergent state behaviour and associated international coordination is increased.

International cooperation is further facilitated if powerful states are involved, as a quasi-structure is created containing the reasons, expectations and arguments for coordination. Also, if epistemic community members have developed authoritative bureaucratic reputations in various countries, they are likely to participate in the creation and running of national and international institutions that directly pursue international policy coordination, for example, a regulatory agency, think tank or governmental research body.

As a result, epistemic community members in a number of different countries can become connected through intergovernmental channels, as well as existing community channels, producing a transnational governance network, and facilitating the promotion of international policy coordination. An example of a scientific epistemic community in action is the 1975 collectively negotiated Mediterranean Action Plan (MAP), a marine pollution control regime for the Mediterranean Sea developed by the United Nations Environment Programme.

Limitations 
Some refutations have been formulated about epistemic communities, in the study of the circulation of international expertise. Firstly, one should be cautious about the risk of retrospective thinking when conceptualizing epistemic communities. Indeed, the solutions proposed by expert groups which are eventually adopted by policy makers are one but many that have been formulated by the scientific community. The epistemic community proposition is confirmed by the fact that the solution adopted are necessarily "tolerable" by policy makers, who choose between all those which have been proposed by the scientific community. Secondly, it is difficult to assess the limits of the term "experts". For instance, the G7 "experts" would in fact be civil servants from the member-states of the organization, who therefore cannot claim the scientific legitimacy of researchers. Finally, this hypothesis does not take into consideration the influence of national contexts in the agenda-setting of epistemic communities. The experts are restricted to the limit of the tolerable in their own national context, which is also crucial in the adoption of the solutions they propose at the local level.

See also
 Epistemic community (international relations)
 Global governance
 Knowledge falsification
 Network governance
 Social network
 Internationalism
 Transnationalism
 International community
 Statism
 Governmentality

References

Further reading
 
 . 
  Details.
 
  Details.

External links
 UNEP Mediterranean Action Plan website

Types of communities
Social epistemology